Kdo may refer to:
 3-deoxy-D-manno-octulosonic acid kinase, an enzyme
 Ketodeoxyoctonic acid
 Kommandeur der Ordnungspolizei (KdO), commander of the German Ordnungspolizei during World War II